The Final Solution was the Nazi plan to kill all the Jews, which culminated in the Holocaust. 

Final Solution(s) or The Final Solution may also refer to:

Film
 Final Solution (2001 film), a South African drama
 Final Solution (2004 film), an Indian documentary about the 2002 Gujarat Riots

Literature
 The Final Solution (novel), a 2004 novel by Michael Chabon
 The Final Solution, a 1953 book by Gerald Reitlinger
 Final Solution: The Fate of the Jews 1933–1949, a 2016 book by David Cesarani
 Final Solutions, a 1993 play by Mahesh Dattani

Music
 The Final Solution (American band), a 1960s garage rock band
 The Final Solution, a 1970s band that recorded the soundtrack album Brotherman
 "Final Solution", a song by Black Label Society from The Blessed Hellride
 "Final Solution", a 1976 single by Pere Ubu
 "Final Solution", a song by Rocket from the Tombs
 "The Final Solution", a song by Sabaton from Coat of Arms

Other uses
 Final Solution (professional wrestler), a ring name of Robert "Jeep" Swenson
 Final Solution of the Czech Question, a Nazi Germany plan for a complete Germanization of Czech Lands
 Final Solution of the German Question, a post-war expulsion of Germans from Czechoslovakia, Final Solution was the term Czechoslovak President Edvard Beneš used to describe the deportations
 "Final solution to the Isaaq problem", a euphemism used during the Isaaq genocide in the late 1980s
 Final Solutions LLC, former name of parent company that owns the internet forum Kiwi Farms
 Term used by former Australian politician Fraser Anning

See also
 Ethnic cleansing, a policy of persecution of an ethnic or religious minority, through imprisonment, expulsion, or killing
 Ideal Final Result, a basic term in TRIZ, a problem solving methodology
 The Final Problem, a story by Sir Arthur Conan Doyle